Roop Chaudhary is an Indian politician and member of the Bharatiya Janata Party. Chaudhary is a first-term member of the Uttar Pradesh Legislative Assembly in 1993 from the Khekada Loni (Assembly constituency) in Uttar Pradesh.

Life 

He was born in a Gujjar family of Ghaziabad, Uttar Pradesh.

References

People from Bagpat district
Bharatiya Janata Party politicians from Uttar Pradesh
Members of the Uttar Pradesh Legislative Assembly
Living people
Year of birth missing (living people)